Panjabrao Shamrao Deshmukh (27 December 1898 – 10 April 1965), also known as Bhausaheb Deshmukh was a social activist and a leader to farmers in India. He was the Minister of Agriculture in the first cabinet of Jawaharlal Nehru in 1952.

Early life
He was born into Maratha family at Papal in Amravati district of Maharashtra on 27 December 1898, his family practised agriculture. His father's name is Shamrao and mother's name is Radhabai. His original surname was Kadam. After completing his primary education in his hometown, he was sent to Songaon and then to Karanja Lad. At Karanja Lad, he reached ninth grade, before he was admitted into Hind High School, Amravati, and Fergusson College in Pune.

At that time, higher education was not available in India. Many students traveled to England for further education. He wanted to be a barrister from Cambridge University. Despite intense poverty at home, he managed to obtain enough money to travel. He then went to the Cambridge University and gained a Ph.D, a barrister degree in 1921 and a M.A. honours in Sanskrit. He finished his Ph.D. with the subject Origin and Development of Religion in Vedic Literature.

Social activities

He studied under Satya Shodhak Samaj of Mahatma Phule. He did satyagraha to allow untouchables to enter Ambabai Temple, Amravati, which was condemned by the upper castes. Dr. Bhimrao Ramji Ambedkar supported him in this movement. The management of the temple later allowed untouchables to enter the temple. Dr. Punjabrao Deshmukh started another equality movement from his home. After the death of his father, his mother asked him to conduct traditional activity "Shradhha" with Brahmins. He brought untouchable students home from his school hostel and his mother treated them as Brahmins.

His marriage ceremony was simple and held in Mumbai. After the marriage ceremony, when he reached Amravati, his friends convinced Deshmukh to give a party. He held a small dinner party for them. The meal was served by youths wearing white. After dinner Bhausaheb stated that the servers were untouchables (violating the prohibition). Many such events were conducted by Dr. Deshmukh to remove untouchability from our society.

Educational activist

In 1931 he established Shivaji Education Society at Amravati. This education society grew to become the second largest in Maharashtra. This society operates 24 degree colleges, 54 intermediate colleges, 75 high schools, and 35 hostels. An agricultural university bearing his name operates at Akola, i.e. Panjabrao Deshmukh Krishi Vidyapeeth. He strengthened the foundation of education throughout Maharashtra.

Politics
He was elected thrice for the Lok Sabha. Dr. Deshmukh was selected by Nehru as Minister of State Agriculture for 10 long years, from 1952 to 1962. He played an important role in the making of the Indian Constitution. He was inspired by B. R. Ambedkar and was a supporter of the mission by Dr. Babasaheb Ambedkar. He was the secretary for Vidarbha region of the Independent Labour Party, established by Dr. Babasaheb Ambedkar.

Leader of peasants
He dedicated his talent and energy for the formulation and implementation of the policies that would bring prosperity to agriculture and the agriculturist. He established the Bharat Krishak Samaj and launched a campaign called Food for Millions in 1955. He introduced the Japanese method of rice cultivation in 1958 and organized the World Agriculture Fair in 1959. The fair was visited by dignitaries across the world, including US President Dwight Eisenhower, Soviet first secretary Nikita Khrushchev, Lord and Lady Mountbatten. 

He started the process of establishing agricultural universities across the country and supported agricultural education and research.

Lawyer
He appeared for poor peasants in many cases at the district court of Amravati. His most predominant case was British Government  vs. Azad Hind Sena, in which he assisted Jawaharlal Nehru.

Legacy
Dr. Deshmukh died on 10 April 1965 at Delhi. He was survived by his wife Vimalabai Deshmukh and one son.

References

External links

Lok Sabah Member Profile
Dr.Panjabrao Krishi Vidyapith,Akola
About Amravati District
Dr. PANJABRAO DESHMUKH ILLUSTRIOUS SON OF INDIA
Shri Shivaji Education Society, Amravati

Activists from Maharashtra
People from Amravati district
Members of the Constituent Assembly of India
India MPs 1952–1957
India MPs 1957–1962
India MPs 1962–1967
Nehru administration
Lok Sabha members from Maharashtra
Agriculture Ministers of India
Marathi politicians
1898 births
1965 deaths
Farmers' rights activists